Diaconia University of Applied Sciences (Diak) is a university of applied sciences (a polytechnic) in Finland. It is affiliated with the Evangelical Lutheran Church of Finland.

Its campuses are located in Helsinki, Oulu, Pori, Pieksämäki and Turku.

References

External links
Official website

Universities and colleges in Finland
Lutheran universities and colleges
Education in Helsinki
Education in Oulu
Education in Turku
Educational institutions established in 1996
1996 establishments in Finland